Kainakary Thankaraj (18 October 1946 – 3 April 2022) was an Indian actor, who worked in the Malayalam movie industry and Malayalam Drama Theater Industry.

Life and career 
Kainakary, the son of the playwright Krishnankutty Bhagavathar, was born on 18 October 1946 in Kainakary, Travancore. He started acting at the age of 13 and worked on several theater committees, including Kerala People's Arts Club. He made his film debut in Aanappaachan (1978) starring Prem Nazir. He went on to act in over 35 films.

Thankaraj started acting in plays while he was still in school and soon became a popular face in the amateur theatre circuit along with Nedumudi Venu, Faasil and Alleppey Ashraf. His first professional play was Changanasserry Geetha. He has been part of many professional theatre collectives including Kottayam National Theaters, Chalakkuddy Saradhi and KPAC. In 1995, he started his own theatre collective named Kainakary Theaters. He also formed a theatre troupe named Ambalappuzha Aksharajwala along with late actor Thilakan.

Kainakary was in treatment for liver-related problems for a long time and died on 3 April 2022 at his home in Velamkonam in Keralapuram. He was 75.

Selected filmography

References

External links 
 

1946 births
2022 deaths
20th-century Indian male actors
Male actors in Malayalam cinema
Indian male film actors
21st-century Indian male actors
People from Alappuzha district